A pyx or pix (transliteration of Greek: πυξίς, boxwood receptacle, from πύξος, box tree) is a small round container used in the Catholic, Old Catholic and Anglican Churches to carry the consecrated host (Eucharist), to the sick or those who are otherwise unable to come to a church in order to receive Holy Communion.  The term can also be used in archaeology and art history to describe small, round lidded boxes designed for any purpose from antiquity or the Middle Ages, such as those used to hold coins for the Trial of the Pyx in England.

Usage

The word "pyx" comes from the Greek word πυξίς, "pyxis" meaning box or receptacle. The plural is pyxides. While the word may be applied to any covered carrier, in the modern usage the term is usually applied to small, flat, clamshell-style containers often about the size of a pocket watch and usually made of brass or other metals, traditionally lined with gold. A fabric or leather pouch in which the pyx may be carried is known as a burse.  Typically, this kind of burse can be securely closed and is fixed with cords so that the priest, deacon, or extraordinary minister of Holy Communion can affix it to his or her person during transport to prevent the consecrated host(s) from being accidentally lost.

These objects, and others, such as the lunette (and the monstrance that holds it) that contain a consecrated host, are normally kept within the church tabernacle when they are not being carried. The tabernacle may be behind the main altar, at a side altar, or within a special Eucharistic chapel.

Liturgical history
In late antiquity, the custom developed in the East of suspending a vessel in the form of a dove (Greek: peristerion, Latin: peristerium) over the altar, which was used as a repository for the Blessed Sacrament. This custom is mentioned by Gregory of Tours in his Life of Saint Basil, and in several ancient French documents.  The custom probably came to France from the East; it never seems to have existed in Italy.  Examples of this practice may still be found in use today; for instance, in the Cathedral of the Dormition in Moscow.

In Eastern Christianity

In the Eastern Orthodox and Greek Catholic Churches, the pyx is the small "church tabernacle" which holds the Lamb (Host) that is reserved for the Liturgy of the Presanctified Gifts during Great Lent. This pyx may be either kept on the Holy Table (altar) or on the Prothesis (Table of Oblation) on the north side of the sanctuary.

Gallery

See also
Ciborium 
Trial of the Pyx

Notes and references

External links

Pyx article from Catholic Encyclopedia
A.S. Duncan-Jones and D. C. Dunlop, The Aumbry and Hanging Pyx (Warham Guild, 1925)

Eucharistic objects
Containers